Florian Pick (born 8 September 1995) is a German professional footballer who plays as a midfielder for  club 1. FC Heidenheim.

Career
In summer 2020, Pick, along with teammate Christian Kühlwetter, joined 2. Bundesliga side 1. FC Heidenheim from 3. Liga club 1. FC Kaiserslautern.

On 22 December 2021, Pick agreed to join Ingolstadt on loan for the rest of the season, with an option to buy.

References

1995 births
Living people
People from Wittlich
German footballers
Association football midfielders
FC Schalke 04 II players
1. FC Kaiserslautern II players
1. FC Kaiserslautern players
1. FC Magdeburg players
1. FC Heidenheim players
FC Ingolstadt 04 players
Regionalliga players
3. Liga players
2. Bundesliga players
Footballers from Rhineland-Palatinate